Drosera katangensis is a plant species endemic to Haut-Katanga, Democratic Republic of Congo. D. katangensis is a perennial helophyte, growing in grassy swamps. It is known from a single collection in 1912, and has not been identified since. It is threatened by logging, mining concessions, agriculture, and has been assessed as CR by the IUCN under criteria B2ab(iii).

References

katangensis
Endemic flora of the Democratic Republic of the Congo